Valeriu Calancea (born November 18, 1980 in Chişinău) is a Romanian weightlifter.

External links
sports-reference.com

1980 births
Living people
Romanian people of Moldovan descent
Romanian male weightlifters
Olympic weightlifters of Romania
World Weightlifting Championships medalists
Weightlifters at the 2000 Summer Olympics
Weightlifters at the 2004 Summer Olympics
Sportspeople from Chișinău
European Weightlifting Championships medalists
21st-century Romanian people